Exchange Bank Building may refer to:

Exchange Bank Building (Tallahassee, Florida)
Exchange Bank Building (Farmington, Minnesota)

See also
Exchange Building (disambiguation)